Muhammad bin Talal Al Rashid ( Muḥammad bin Ṭalāl Āl Rašīd; c.1904 – 1954) was the twelfth and last emir of Jabal Shammar in Ha'il. He ruled from early 1920 to 2 November 1921.

Reign
Muhammad began his rule in early 1921, after the reign of Emir Abdullah bin Mutaib ended, which signaled the end of the Emirate of Jabal Shammar. Abdulaziz Al Saud, Emir of Nejd and future King of Saudi Arabia, made it his goal to include the territory occupied by Jabal Shammar in his nation. Emir Muhammad, the people of Ha'il, and the Shammar and Bani Tamim tribes fought several battles against the Al Saud forces, but Emir Abdulaziz reigned triumphant, and the Emirate of Ha'il (Jabal Shammar) joined the Saudi State. Ha'il fell to Abdulaziz on 2 November 1921. Afterwards, Muhammad bin Talal moved to Riyadh.

Personal life and death
One of Muhammad's wives was Noura bint Sibhan. Abdulaziz Al Saud forced Muhammad to divorce Noura so that he could marry her himself. However, Abdulaziz soon divorced Noura. Next, he married Muhammad's daughter Jawaher (born to some other wife, not Noura).

Again, at Abdulaziz'z behest (or insistence), Muhammad's other daughter, Princess Watfa, was married to Musaid bin Abdulaziz Al Saud, a son of Abdulaziz. Thus, the sisters Jawaher and Watfa became mother-in-law and daughter-in-law to each other. The son born to Watfa and Musaid al-Saud, namely Faisal bin Musaid, assassinated Musaid's half-brother King Faisal on 25 March 1975.

Muhammad bin Talāl's granddaughter is Madawi al-Rasheed.

Muhammad bin Talāl died in Riyadh in 1954, one year after the death of Abdulaziz al-Saud.

References

20th-century rulers in Asia
1900s births
1954 deaths
House of Rashid
People from Ha'il